Keith Jack Oliver (born 14 August 1942 in Chadwell Heath, Essex) is a British former Formula One driver and team-owner from England. He became known as the founder of the Arrows team as well as a racing driver, although during his driving career he won both the 24 Hours of Le Mans race and the Can-Am championship. Oliver was also the second person to complete the informal triple Crown of endurance racing.

Driving career

Oliver began a long career in motorsport in 1961, driving a Mini in British club saloon racing. In 1962 and 1963 he raced for Ecurie Freeze in a Marcos GT. In 1964 He raced in a Lotus Elan driving for D.R. Fabrications team and entered GT racing, scoring some excellent results, and then having a difficult time in Formula Three, where his natural speed was blighted by mechanical failures.

Nevertheless, for 1967 he was drafted into the Team Lotus Formula Two team, which also saw him making his Grand Prix debut in the F2 class at the German Grand Prix, where he came fifth overall and won the F2 class. In 1968, he was called up by Colin Chapman to take over the works Formula One seat for Team Lotus after the death of Jim Clark. His contract did not include an F2 drive. In discussions with Tony Rudlin, a failed racing driver, at that time responsible for running the Herts and Essex Aero Club for ex-world motor cycling champion, Roger Frogley, a deal was struck to run in the club's colours. Lotus supplied and ran the car, supplied the mechanics and generally acted as competition managers while Rudlin was team manager. The F2 team was reasonably successful although not running full Team Lotus spec. At the end of the year the team was invited to compete in the four races making up the Argentine Temporada. The Herts and Essex Team finished third overall in the series. The F1 season would turn out to be difficult, with Oliver struggling for finishes. He led the British Grand Prix until an engine failure, and would only finish twice, his best result being third place at the season-closing Mexican Grand Prix.

With Jochen Rindt signing for Lotus for 1969, Oliver switched to BRM. He was to suffer disappointing two years at the Bourne team, which would effectively kill off his Grand Prix career. In two years, he would muster just four finishes, with his only points scores being sixth place in the 1969 Mexican Grand Prix, and fifth in the 1970 Austrian Grand Prix. However, in 1970, he led much of the Race of Champions holding off Stewart and was a strong third for most of the Dutch and British GP. The poor result in the Austrian GP which Team boss, Louis Stanley thought he should have won, saw the best car go to Pedro Rodríguez from then on, but Oliver still led some laps at the slipstream Italian race. Stanley described Oliver, as 'good, but not nearly as good as he thought'. The majority of his other races saw the BRM break down. Most pundits and sponsor, Yardley, were surprised and disappointed after Oliver was sacked by BRM. Jackie Stewart, judged Oliver a very good GP and Can-Am driver.

His best results in these seasons would come from endurance racing, in John Wyer's Gulf Ford GT40, winning the 12 Hours of Sebring and 24 Hours of Le Mans events with Jacky Ickx in 1969, and the 24 Hours of Daytona and the 1000 km Monza in 1971 with Rodríguez.

In 1969, he debuted in CanAm, initially for Autocoast in the TI-22, and then for Don Nichols' Shadow team. 1971 saw him out of a full-time Formula One drive, though he had three drives in a third McLaren. 1972 saw him concentrate mainly on CanAm with Shadow, though he would take a one-off drive for BRM at the 1972 British Grand Prix, where he retired.

For 1973, Shadow entered F1, and Oliver was nominated as team leader. The Shadow DN1 proved a difficult chassis, and once again his season was blighted by mechanical errors. However, in the Canadian Grand Prix he ran well, and many believe he actually won the race, but the lap charts were thrown into confusion by a rain shower meaning multiple pit-stops, and a staggeringly inept deployment of a pace car by the organisers. As it was, Oliver was classified third, his only points finish of the year.

1974 saw Oliver concentrate on CanAm, taking the series title for Shadow. He was becoming more involved in the management side of Shadow, but would compete in Formula 5000 for the team for three seasons, and even briefly returned to F1, finishing fifth in the 1977 Race of Champions, and taking 9th in the Swedish Grand Prix.

He also competed in 8 NASCAR Cup Series races between 1971 and 1972, the majority of them for Donlavey Racing. He attempted the 1972 Daytona 500 but failed to qualify.

Arrows

At the end of 1977 he left Shadow along with financer Franco Ambrosio, designers Tony Southgate and Alan Rees, engineer Dave Wass and driver Riccardo Patrese to form the Arrows Grand Prix team.

Arrows would become famous for competing in a record 382 Grands Prix without achieving a single victory. However, the team would always have well-presented cars which would usually be competitive, if not front-runners, and would often give breaks to talented drivers - besides Patrese, Thierry Boutsen, Gerhard Berger, Marc Surer and Martin Donnelly would all drive for the team early in their career.

Oliver sold much of his stake to the Japanese Footwork Corporation in 1990, remaining as director, but the team failed to move forward and the company pulled out at the end of 1993 due to financial trouble. Oliver had his team back, but money was tight, and in 1996 he again sold most of his shares to Tom Walkinshaw's TWR group. Oliver remained on the board until 1999, when he sold his remaining shares.

Racing record

Complete British Saloon Car Championship results
(key) (Races in bold indicate pole position; races in italics indicate fastest lap.)

† Events with 2 races staged for the different classes.

^ Race with 2 heats - Aggregate result.

Complete Formula One World Championship results
(key) (Races in italics indicate fastest lap)

* First in the Formula Two (F2) class, Oliver was ineligible to score points in the 1967 German Grand Prix because he was driving a F2 car.

Complete Formula One Non-Championship results
(key) (Races in italics indicate fastest lap)

Complete Canadian-American Challenge Cup results
(key) (Races in bold indicate pole position) (Races in italics indicate fastest lap)

References

 Sources

1942 births
Living people
English Formula One drivers
European Formula Two Championship drivers
Formula One team owners
Formula One team principals
Team Lotus Formula One drivers
BRM Formula One drivers
McLaren Formula One drivers
Shadow Formula One drivers
Can Am drivers
NASCAR drivers
People from Chadwell Heath
British Touring Car Championship drivers
24 Hours of Le Mans drivers
24 Hours of Le Mans winning drivers
24 Hours of Daytona drivers
World Sportscar Championship drivers
Sportspeople from Essex
12 Hours of Sebring drivers
Arrows Grand Prix International